Arablish (from Arabic and English) is slang for code-switching between the two languages or macaronically using features of one in the other. The term is first recorded in 1984. It is alternatively termed Arbalizi, a portmanteau combining the words Arabic and Inglizi (the word for 'English' in Arabic).

Usage of Arablish/Arbalizi particularly among the youth may be as a result of poor knowledge of one language or the other or both, or may be usage for introducing a humorous effect. Arablish/Arablizi is being increasingly used in ordinary conversations and online.

Arablish usually consists of either filling in gaps in one's knowledge of Arabic with English words,  speaking Arabic in such a manner that (although ostensibly "Arabic") would be incomprehensible to an Arab language speaker who does not also have a working knowledge of English.

References

Arabic language
Macaronic forms of English